Catalan Solidarity (SC) was a political party in Catalonia founded in February 1980. The party was supported by the People's Alliance (AP) ahead of the 1980 Catalan regional election, but failed to win any seats.

References

Political parties in Catalonia
Political parties established in 1980
Conservative parties in Spain
1980 establishments in Spain
Political parties disestablished in 1980
1980 disestablishments in Spain